Veenhuizen is a hamlet in the Netherlands and it is part of the Coevorden municipality in Drenthe. North of Veenhuizen is Oosterhesselen and east is Dalen.

Veenhuizen is not a statistical entity, and the postal authorities have placed it under Dalen. It was first mentioned in 1792 as De Veenhuizen, and means "houses in the bog". In 1840, it was home to 46 people. Nowadays, it has about 10 houses.

References 

Coevorden
Populated places in Drenthe